Britta Curl (born March 20, 2000) is an American women's ice hockey player for Wisconsin. She represented the United States women's national ice hockey team at the 2021 IIHF Women's World Championship.

Playing career

NCAA
Curl began her collegiate career for the Wisconsin Badgers during the 2018–19 season. She recorded her first career goal on October 5, 2018, in a game against Mercyhurst. She was named the WCHA Rookie of the Week for the week ending October 30, 2018, after she recorded a goal and an assist to tie for the WCHA rookie scoring lead during the weekend. On February 9, 2019, she tied a her career-high with three points in a game against Minnesota State. She was subsequently named WCHA Player of the Week for the week ending February 12, 2019. During a weekend series against St. Cloud State, she recorded two multi-goal games. Her four goals tied for the WCHA and NCAA lead in scoring. She became the seventh Badger freshman to score 20 or more goals in her rookie season. She was subsequently named the WCHA Rookie of the Week for the week ending March 5, 2019. During her freshman season, she recorded 22 goals and 11 assists and helped the Badgers win the National Collegiate Women's Ice Hockey Championship. Her 22 goals were tied for the fifth-most in program history by a freshman. She became the eighth Badger to score 20 goals her freshman year and the first player to do so since Annie Pankowski in 2015. 

During the 2019–20 season she recorded 16 goals and nine assists in 36 games in a season that was cancelled due to the COVID-19 pandemic. On November 12, 2020, she was named an alternate captain for the 2020–21 season. During her junior season, she recorded seven goals and ten assists in 21 games and helped the Badgers repeat as national champions.

International play
Curl represented the United States at the 2018 IIHF World Women's U18 Championships, where she recorded four goals and four assists and won a gold medal.

On March 30, 2021, she was named to the roster for the United States at the 2021 IIHF Women's World Championship.

Personal life
Curl was born to Bill and Gretchen Curl. She has two brothers, Byrne and Cullen, and one sister, Brenna.

Career statistics

Regular season and playoffs

International

References

External links

2000 births
Living people
American women's ice hockey forwards
Wisconsin Badgers women's ice hockey players
Ice hockey people from North Dakota
Sportspeople from Bismarck, North Dakota